The men's singles was one of two tennis events on the Tennis at the 1896 Summer Olympics programme. The sixteen entrants were seeded into a single-elimination tournament, with only thirteen or fifteen of the players actually competing. They represented six nations.

Background

This was the first appearance of the men's singles tennis. The event has been held at every Summer Olympics where tennis has been on the program: from 1896 to 1924 and then from 1988 to the current program. Demonstration events were held in 1968 and 1984.

None of the leading players of the time, such as Wimbledon champion Harold Mahony, U.S champion Robert Wrenn, William Larned or Wilfred Baddeley, participated.

Competition format

Under ancient Greek single-elimination tournament rules, there were no brackets as under modern single-elimination rules; instead, all participants in a round were paired off with one bye if a round had an odd number of participants left. This format could result in a semifinals round with only 3 competitors (as happened in both the 1896 wrestling and doubles tennis events, which started with 5 wrestlers/pairs: the first round had two matches, with one wrestler/pair having a bye, and the second round had only one match, with another wrestler/pair having a bye; a modern tournament would have had one match in the first round with three byes, leading to two semifinals). The organizers avoided this problem in the singles tennis by dividing the players into four groups, with each group playing a single elimination tournament and the winner of each group advancing to the semifinals.

No bronze medal match was held; both semifinal losers are now considered bronze medal winners (the current medal system was not used at the time).

Schedule

Draw

Finals

The International Society of Olympic Historians gives only thirteen players; according to them Frank and George Marshall did not participate.

Results summary

References

  (Digitally available at )
  (Excerpt available at )
 
  ITF, 2008 Olympic Tennis Event Media Guide

Men's singles